Greenfield (also Green) is an unincorporated community in Rankin County, Mississippi, United States.

The settlement is named for S. Green, an early settler.  Greenfield had a post office from 1891 to 1935.

An early railway line, owned by the Jackson & Brandon Railroad & Bridge Company, was built through Greenfield in the 1830s.  The line is currently owned by the Kansas City Southern Railway.

References

Unincorporated communities in Rankin County, Mississippi
Unincorporated communities in Mississippi